The 1928 Delaware State Hornets football team represented Delaware State University in the 1928 college football season as an independent. Delaware State compiled a 1–1–1 record.

Schedule

References

Delaware State
Delaware State Hornets football seasons
College football winless seasons
Delaware State Hornets football